The South Africa U-17 women's national football team, nicknamed Bantwana, is the national team of South Africa for under 17 and is controlled by the South African Football Association.

Competitive record

FIFA U-17 Women's World Cup record

African U-17 Cup of Nations for Women record

See also
South Africa women's national football team

External links
Official website

Women's soccer in South Africa
Women's national under-17 association football teams
Soccer